Malick Neme Mané (born 14 October 1988) is a Senegalese former footballer who played as a forward.

Career

Club

Aktobe
In February 2011, Mané moved to Kazakhstan, signing a year-long loan contract with Kazakhstan Premier League side FC Aktobe. Aktobe also had the option to buy Mané at the end of his loan deal for $1 million.

Sogndal
In February 2012, Mané joined Sogndal Fotball on a two-year contract.

IFK Göteborg
On 12 March 2014, Mané signed a four-year contract with Swedish Allsvenskan side IFK Göteborg.

In July 2014, Mané joined A-League side Central Coast Mariners on a season-long loan from IFK Göteborg. Mané returned to Sweden in December after failing to settle in Australia. Shortly after returning from Australia, Mané signed a one-year loan deal with Norwegian OBOS-ligaen side Hønefoss. In September 2015, Mané's loan deal with Hønefoss was cut short and he was sent on loan to Saudi Professional League side Najran SC until 15 July 2016.

On 13 February 2016, Mané's contract with IFK Göteborg was terminated.

Taraz
Following his release from IFK Göteborg, Mané went on trial with Kazakhstan Premier League side FC Taraz in late February, signing for them on 26 February 2016.

Atyrau
On 3 July 2019, Mané returned to Kazakhstan, signing for FC Atyrau.
He Is the brother of Sadio Mane

Career statistics

Club

International

References

External links
 
 
 
 Malick Mané at Footballdatabase

1988 births
Living people
Association football forwards
Association football wingers
Senegalese footballers
Senegal international footballers
Casa Sports players
Sandefjord Fotball players
FC Aktobe players
Sogndal Fotball players
Hønefoss BK players
IFK Göteborg players
Najran SC players
FC Taraz players
KF Laçi players
Inner Mongolia Zhongyou F.C. players
Norwegian First Division players
Eliteserien players
Allsvenskan players
A-League Men players
Kazakhstan Premier League players
China League One players
Kategoria Superiore players
Expatriate footballers in Norway
Senegalese expatriate footballers
Senegalese expatriate sportspeople in Norway
Senegalese expatriate sportspeople in Kazakhstan
Senegalese expatriate sportspeople in China
Senegalese expatriate sportspeople in Saudi Arabia
Expatriate footballers in Kazakhstan
Expatriate footballers in China
Expatriate footballers in Saudi Arabia
Saudi Professional League players